The Batavian flag (contemporaneous Dutch: Bataafsche vlag; also called Nationale vlag, "National flag") is a Dutch historical flag. It was designed by Dirk Langendijk in January 1796, and introduced in March 1796 as the official flag of the navy of the Batavian Republic, replacing the Statenvlag (itself originating from the Prince's Flag).

Description 

The flag's colours and rows remained exactly the same (although the red and blue appear to have grown darker), but an important alteration was done by adding a jack in the upper left corner, several thumbs from the flagpole. This constituted a white rectangle, containing:
the Dutch, Batavian or Freedom Maiden;
the Dutch or Batavian Lion or Leo Belgicus;
a spear, held by both the Maiden and the Lion;
a liberty hat on top of the spear;
a shield with a fasces, held by the Maiden;
some green and leaves as base and background.

History 
By resolution of 1 March 1796, the Batavian flag was introduced for the Dutch fleet. The flag was also used in the early days of the Kingdom of Holland (since 5 June 1806).

The Statenvlag's replacement at the fleet led some sailors to uproar, as they were used to the old flag under which they had won many sea battles. In August 1806, as the Dutch navy was fighting losing battles against Britain, especially in the Dutch East Indies, a riot broke out amongst the crew of the Texel squadron and the warships of Amsterdam, stating they no longer wished to sail under the new flag. A few of them refused to take the oath of loyalty to King Louis Bonaparte, and declared they did not want to take orders from royals officers.

This revolt was severely punished, one of the mutineers was even shot through the head on the spot by vice admiral De Winter. To calm the rioters down, the Statenvlag was hoisted, bringing the uproar to an end. Since the revolt, the Statenvlag was de facto in use again. Over a year later, this was affirmed by Royal Decree on 1 December 1807. However, its name was changed to Koninklijke Hollandsche Vlag ("Royal Flag of Holland").

References 

Batavian Republic
Historical flags
Flags of the Netherlands
Flags introduced in 1796
Flags displaying animals